Dr. T may refer to:

 Dr. T & the Women, 2000 American romantic comedy film
 The 5,000 Fingers of Dr. T., 1953 American musical fantasy film